Frida Svensson (born 16 October 1989) is a Swedish football midfielder.

Honours 
Eskilstuna United DFF
Runner-up
 Damallsvenskan: 2015

References

External links 
 
 
 

1989 births
Living people
Swedish women's footballers
Eskilstuna United DFF players
Damallsvenskan players
Women's association football midfielders